Virginia Water Football Club is a football club based in Virginia Water, Surrey, England.

Teams
First Team - Play home games at Stag Meadow, Windsor and play in 
Reserve Team - Play home games at The Timbers, Virginia Water, Surrey, England and play in the Surrey Premier Intermediate League
Youth Teams - Youth Teams (u18s to u7s) play home games at The Timbers, Virginia Water, Surrey, England and play in the Surrey Primary League

Key individuals
Chairman: Dave McBride
Director of Football: Ceri Jones
1st Team Manager: Adam Bessant

Honours 
Hellenic League:
Division One Champions 2017-18 (1)

External links

Football clubs in England
Football clubs in Surrey
Association football clubs established in 1920
1920 establishments in England
Surrey Senior League
Spartan League
Combined Counties Football League
Surrey County Senior League
Hellenic Football League
Surrey Elite Intermediate Football League